Andrew Short House (originally listed as the Florendin Feasel House) is a historic home located at Henrietta, Monroe County, New York. It was built about 1855, and is a two-story, front gabled frame dwelling with two single-story rear additions.  It is of vertical wood plank construction and one of a few surviving farm houses from the 19th century.

It was listed on the National Register of Historic Places in 2014.

References

Houses on the National Register of Historic Places in New York (state)
Houses completed in 1855
Buildings and structures in Monroe County, New York
National Register of Historic Places in Monroe County, New York